Rossens can be either of two municipalities in Switzerland:

 Rossens, Fribourg
 Rossens, Vaud

See also
 Rossen, a surname and given name